Dichomeris aulotoma is a moth in the family Gelechiidae. It was described by Edward Meyrick in 1917. It is found in South Africa.

The forewings are rather dark fuscous with a white streak along the costa from the base nearly to one-third, and a subcostal streak from beyond the extremity of this to the costa before the apex. There is a white subdorsal streak rising from the base of the dorsum and running to the termen beneath the apex, posteriorly somewhat ragged. The hindwings are grey.

References

Endemic moths of South Africa
Moths described in 1917
aulotoma